Krissy Chin (born January 24, 1980) is a professional figure competitor from the United States. She qualified for Ms. Olympia in 2009–2012 and finished in 16th position in 2009–2011. She won the NPC Team Universe in 2007 and Northern California Pro Bikini in 2014, about 18 months after becoming a mother. She is sponsored by Gaspari Nutrition, a bodybuilding supplements company based in the United Kingdom.

Chin's lineage comes from mainland China, though her mother was born in New York and her father in Hong Kong. They both died of cancer in the 1990s. Chin graduated in 2000 from Touro College in New York with a master's degree in physical therapy. She started competing in fitness and bodybuilding in 2003 as an amateur, and became professional in 2007. Chin is married to Troy Johnson, who is also a bodybuilding fan. On November 26, 2012, she gave birth to a girl named London Johnson, and for this reason was away from competitions in 2013. She finished second at the 2012 IFBB California Governors Cup not knowing that she was 6 weeks pregnant – she was taking birth control pills and did not plan to become a mother yet. That year she qualified for her fourth consecutive Ms. Olympia, but had to withdraw.

Competition history

2015 IFBB Northern California, Bikini Masters Professional – 1st
2014 IFBB Sacramento, Bikini Masters Professional – 3rd
2014 IFBB Europa Phoenix – 14th
2014 IFBB Korea Pro – 6th
2014 IFBB Northern California Pro Bikini – 1st
2014 IFBB Dennis James Pro Bikini – 6th
2012 IFBB California Governors Cup – 2nd
2012 IFBB Arnold Classic – 10th
2011 IFBB Border States Pro Figure – 2nd
2011 IFBB Houston Pro – 4th
2011 IFBB Olympia – 16th, Figure, Professional
2011 IFBB Tournament of Champions Pro Figure – 3rd
2011 IFBB California Pro Figure – 2nd
2011 IFBB Optimum Classic Pro Figure & Bikini – 2nd
2010 IFBB Border States Pro Figure – 11th
2010 IFBB Houston Pro Figure & Bikini – 8th
2010 IFBB Olympia – 16th, Figure, Professional
2010 IFBB Arnold Classic, Ms. International, Fitness International & Figure International – 15th
2009 IFBB Border States Pro Figure – 3rd
2009 IFBB Olympia – 16th, Figure, Professional
2009 IFBB Houston Pro Figure – 4th
2009 IFBB Europa Super Show & Supplement Expo – 2nd
2009 IFBB Jacksonville Pro – 4th
2009 IFBB California State Pro Figure Championships – 9th
2008 IFBB Atlantic City Pro – 6th
2008 IFBB New York Pro Figure – 14th
2008 IFBB Jacksonville Pro-Figure / Dexter Jackson Classic – 4th
2008 IFBB Houston Pro Bodybuilding, Fitness & Figure Contest – 7th
2007 IFBB Europa Super Show – 16th
2007 IFBB Houston Pro Figure Contest – 7th
2007 NPC Team Universe Bodybuilding, Fitness And Figure Championships – 1st
2007 NPC Junior Nationals Bodybuilding, Fitness And Figure Contest – 2nd
2007 NPC Gaspari Nutrition Jr. USA Bodybuilding, Fitness and Figure Championships – 2nd

References

1980 births
Living people
Fitness and figure competitors
American sportspeople of Chinese descent